Maurice Ahern (born 1938/39) is a former Irish Fianna Fáil politician. He was a member of Dublin City Council for the Cabra–Glasnevin local electoral area from 1999 to 2009. He was first elected at the 1999 local elections, topping the poll. He was re-elected at the 2004 local elections. He was the Lord Mayor of Dublin in 2000, and formerly Leader of the Fianna Fáil group on the council. He was a member of the Irish Sports Council.

Married to Moira Murray-Ahern, he has five sons and one daughter. His eldest son, Dylan Ahern, was found dead in his apartment on 22 November 2009.

He is the elder brother of Bertie Ahern and Noel Ahern, both of whom served as Fianna Fáil TDs, Bertie Ahern having served as Taoiseach from 1997–2008.

He was the Fianna Fáil candidate in the Dublin Central by-election which was held on 5 June 2009. He lost that election being beaten into 5th place. On the same day, he also lost his council seat in the 2009 local elections.

References

1930s births
Living people
Year of birth uncertain
Maurice
Fianna Fáil politicians
Lord Mayors of Dublin
Sport Ireland officials
People educated at O'Connell School